Contrails (short for "condensation trails") or vapor trails are line-shaped clouds produced by aircraft engine exhaust or changes in air pressure, typically at aircraft cruising altitudes several miles above the Earth's surface. Contrails are composed primarily of water, in the form of ice crystals. The combination of water vapor in aircraft engine exhaust and the low ambient temperatures that exist at high altitudes allows the formation of the trails. Impurities in the engine exhaust from the fuel, including sulfur compounds (0.05% by weight in jet fuel) provide some of the particles that can serve as nucleation sites for water droplet growth in the exhaust. If water droplets form, they might freeze to form ice particles that compose a contrail. Their formation can also be triggered by changes in air pressure in wingtip vortices or in the air over the entire wing surface. Contrails, and other clouds directly resulting from human activity, are collectively named homogenitus.

Depending on the temperature and humidity at the altitude the contrails form, they may be visible for only a few seconds or minutes, or may persist for hours and spread to be several miles wide, eventually resembling natural cirrus or altocumulus clouds. Persistent contrails are of particular interest to scientists because they increase the cloudiness of the atmosphere. The resulting cloud forms are formally described as homomutatus, and may resemble cirrus, cirrocumulus, or cirrostratus, and are sometimes called cirrus aviaticus. Some persistent spreading contrails contribute to climate change.

Condensation trails as a result of engine exhaust

Engine exhaust is predominantly made up of water and carbon dioxide, the combustion products of hydrocarbon fuels. Many other chemical byproducts of incomplete hydrocarbon fuel combustion, including volatile organic compounds, inorganic gases, polycyclic aromatic hydrocarbons, oxygenated organics, alcohols, ozone and particles of soot have been observed at lower concentrations. The exact quality is a function of engine type and basic combustion engine function, with up to 30% of aircraft exhaust being unburned fuel. (Micron-sized metallic particles resulting from engine wear have also been detected.) At high altitudes as this water vapor emerges into a cold environment, the localized increase in water vapor can raise the relative humidity of the air past saturation point. The vapor then condenses into tiny water droplets which freeze if the temperature is low enough. These millions of tiny water droplets and/or ice crystals form the contrails. The time taken for the vapor to cool enough to condense accounts for the contrail forming some distance behind the aircraft. At high altitudes, supercooled water vapor requires a trigger to encourage deposition or condensation. The exhaust particles in the aircraft's exhaust act as this trigger, causing the trapped vapor to condense rapidly. Exhaust contrails usually form at high altitudes; usually above , where the air temperature is below . They can also form closer to the ground when the air is cold and moist.

A 2013–2014 study jointly supported by NASA, the German aerospace center DLR, and Canada's National Research Council NRC, determined that biofuels could reduce contrail generation. This reduction was explained by demonstrating that biofuels produce fewer soot particles, which are the nuclei around which the ice crystals form. The tests were performed by flying a DC-8 at cruising altitude with a sample-gathering aircraft flying in trail. In these samples, the contrail-producing soot particle count was reduced by 50 to 70 percent, using a 50% blend of conventional Jet A1 fuel and HEFA (hydroprocessed esters and fatty acids) biofuel produced from camelina.

Condensation from decreases in pressure

As a wing generates lift, it causes a vortex to form at the wingtip, and at the tip of the flap when deployed (wingtips and flap-boundaries are discontinuities in airflow.) These wingtip vortices persist in the atmosphere long after the aircraft has passed. The reduction in pressure and temperature across each vortex can cause water to condense and make the cores of the wingtip vortices visible. This effect is more common on humid days. Wingtip vortices can sometimes be seen behind the wing flaps of airliners during takeoff and landing, and during landing of the Space Shuttle.

The visible cores of wingtip vortices contrast with the other major type of contrails which are caused by the combustion of fuel. Contrails produced from jet engine exhaust are seen at high altitude, directly behind each engine. By contrast, the visible cores of wingtip vortices are usually seen only at low altitude where the aircraft is travelling slowly after takeoff or before landing, and where the ambient humidity is higher. They trail behind the wingtips and wing flaps rather than behind the engines.

At high-thrust settings the fan blades at the intake of a turbofan engine reach transonic speeds, causing a sudden drop in air pressure. This creates the condensation fog (inside the intake) which is often observed by air travelers during takeoff.

The tips of rotating surfaces (such as propellers and rotors) sometimes produce visible contrails.

In firearms, a vapor trail is sometimes observed when firing under rare conditions due to changes in air pressure around the bullet. A vapor trail from a bullet is observable from any direction. Vapor trail should not be confused with bullet trace, which is a much more common phenomenon (and is usually only observable directly from behind the shooter).

Radiative forcing

Contrails, by affecting the Earth's radiation balance, act as a radiative forcing: they trap outgoing longwave radiation emitted by the Earth and atmosphere more than they reflect incoming solar radiation.
In 1992, the warming effect was estimated between 3.5 mW/m2 and 17 mW/m2.
Global radiative forcing has been calculated from the reanalysis data, climate models, and radiative transfer codes; estimated at 12 mW/m2 for 2005, with an uncertainty range of 5 to 26 mW/m2, and with a low level of scientific understanding.

The effect varies daily and annually: night flights contribute 60 to 80% of contrail radiative forcing while accounting for 25% of daily air traffic, while winter flights contribute half of the annual mean radiative forcing while accounting for 22% of annual air traffic.
Contrail cirrus may be air traffic's largest radiative forcing component, larger than all  accumulated from aviation, and could triple from a 2006 baseline to 160-180 mW/m2 by 2050 Without interventions.

Condensation trails may cause regional-scale surface temperature changes for some time.
NASA researched atmospheric and climatological effects of contrails, including effects on ozone, ice crystal formation, and particle composition, during the  Atmospheric Effects of Aviation Project (AEAP).

Bomber contrails affected climate during World War II.
A  hotter temperature  was recorded near airbases.

Diurnal temperature variation 

The diurnal temperature variation is the difference in the day's highs and lows at a fixed station.
Contrails decrease the daytime temperature and increase the nighttime temperature, reducing their difference.

Measured across 4,000 weather stations in the continental United States, this increase was the largest recorded in 30 years.
Without contrails, the local diurnal temperature range was  higher than immediately before.
This was maybe due to unusually clear weather during the period.

Head-on contrails
A contrail from an airplane flying towards the observer can appear to be generated by an object moving vertically. On 8 November 2010 in the US state of California, a contrail of this type gained media attention as a "mystery missile" that could not be explained by U.S. military and aviation authorities, and its explanation as a contrail took more than 24 hours to become accepted by U.S. media and military institutions.

Distrails

Where an aircraft passes through a cloud, it can disperse the cloud in its path. This is known as a distrail (short for "dissipation trail"). The plane's warm engine exhaust and enhanced vertical mixing in the aircraft's wake can cause existing cloud droplets to evaporate.  If the cloud is sufficiently thin, such processes can yield a cloud-free corridor in an otherwise solid cloud layer. An early satellite observation of distrails that most likely were elongated, aircraft-induced fallstreak holes appeared in Corfidi and Brandli (1986).

Clouds form when invisible water vapor ( in gas phase) condenses into microscopic water droplets ( in liquid phase) or into microscopic ice crystals ( in solid phase). This may happen when air with a high proportion of gaseous water cools. A distrail forms when the heat of engine exhaust evaporates the liquid water droplets in a cloud, turning them back into invisible, gaseous water vapor.  Distrails also may arise as a result of enhanced mixing (entrainment of) drier air immediately above or below a thin cloud layer following passage of an aircraft through the cloud, as shown in the second image below:

Gallery

See also

 Chemtrail conspiracy theory
 Cirrus cloud
 Cloud chamber – particle detector that works on similar principle
 Environmental impact of aviation
 Fallstreak hole
 Global dimming
 Ship tracks
 Skywriting
 Space jellyfish
 Twomey effect

References

External links

 Contrail Education (archived) | NASA
 Contrails.nl: Contrails and AviationSmog  | Galleys of contrails and aviation smog
 Contral Science | Reference site for debunking weird stories about contrails
 

Aviation meteorology
Cloud types
Cirrus
Cloud and fog physics
Climate forcing